Peter Jeffrey Tomasulo (born October 22, 1981) is an American professional golfer who plays on the Web.com Tour.

Amateur career
Tomasulo was born in Long Beach, California. He attended the University of California, Berkeley and in 2004 was named a first team All-American and captained California's NCAA championship team. In 2003 he set the school's all-time single-season stroke average at 70.98 and played on the U.S. Palmer Cup team that lost 14-10 to Europe.

Professional career
Tomasulo turned professional in 2004. In 2005 he played on the Canadian Tour and the Nationwide Tour and won once on each tour. He won the Montreal Open on the Canadian Tour and the Alberta Classic on the Nationwide Tour. He also won his hometown Long Beach Open. 2005 was the only year he played on the Canadian Tour but Tomasulo continued to play on the Nationwide Tour until 2008. In 2008, 7 top-10 finishes helped him earn $296,704 and finish 11th on the money list. By finishing in the top 25 of the Nationwide Tour's money list, he earned his PGA Tour card for 2009. He struggled on the PGA Tour, making only 5 of 25 cuts and losing his tour card. He played on the Nationwide Tour again in 2010, winning the Ford Wayne Gretzky Classic in July. He finished the year 23rd on the money list and earned his 2011 PGA Tour card. He battled injuries in 2011 and 2012 before returning to the Web.com Tour (formerly the Nationwide Tour). He won in his second tournament back, defeating David Lingmerth in a playoff at the United Leasing Championship. For 2013, Tomasulo has a Medical Extension available on the PGA Tour with 12 starts.

Professional wins (5)

Web.com Tour wins (3)

Web.com Tour playoff record (1–0)

Canadian Tour wins (1)
2005 Lexus Montreal Open

Other wins (1)
2005 Long Beach Open

Results in major championships

CUT = missed the half-way cut

U.S. national team appearances
Amateur
Palmer Cup: 2003

See also
2008 Nationwide Tour graduates
2010 Nationwide Tour graduates

External links

American male golfers
California Golden Bears men's golfers
PGA Tour golfers
Korn Ferry Tour graduates
Golfers from California
Sportspeople from Long Beach, California
1981 births
Living people